Siddharth Haldipur is an Indian singer and music director. He is a part of the Sangeet-Siddharth music director duo. The duo has given music for prominent Hindi as well as Marathi movies. In their few years of music direction, the duo has composed hit songs for Murder 2, Blood Money, Aatma, Fruit & Nut, Bird Idol and Hum Hai Raahi Car Ke. Siddharth Haldipur started his foray into music with A Band of Boys and is also a trained violinist, pianist, and dancer. He and Sangeet Haldipur are the sons of the famous composer Amar Haldipur, who has also been India's number one violinist in the past.

Career
Sangeet-Siddharth rose to prominence with their top-of-the-line composition "Aa Zara Kareeb Se", from the movie Murder 2, for which they won the Big Star Young Entertainer Award for Best Music Composer in 2012. This marked their entry into the mainstream Bollywood music scene.

Discography

Music director (Sangeet Siddharth)
 Fruit and Nut (2009)
 Bird Idol (2010)
 Murder 2 (2011)
 Blood Money (2012)
 Once Upon the Tracks of Mumbai (2012 novel) 
 Nasha (2013)
 Aatma - Feel It Around You (2013)
 Hum Hai Raahi Car Ke (2013)
 Mad About Dance (2014)
 Untitled (2015)
Love Games (2016)
 Raaz Reboot

Marathi Movies
 Runh (2015, Marathi)

TV serials

Ek Boond Ishq – Title track – Life OK (2013)

Singer/writer/performer (A Band of Boys)

Album – Yeh Bhi Woh Bhi (2002)
 Meri Neend
 Gori
 Tera Chehra
 Ishq
 Thirchi Nazar
 She Drives Me Crazy
 Elements (Aayi Ho Jabse)
Album – Gaane Bhi Do Yaaro (2006)
 Nain Kataari
 Funkh With You
 Aa Bhi Jaa Ae Mere Humdum
 Sunlo Zaraa
 Jhoomengi Bahaaren
 Aaye Aaye
 Mast Kalandar
 Main Chal Diya

Filmography
Kiss Kis Ko – Himself (2004)

References

imdb.com Retrieved 2013-03-24

Indian male playback singers
Indian male composers
Bollywood playback singers
Male actors in Hindi cinema
Living people
Year of birth missing (living people)
Place of birth missing (living people)